Mogollon, also called the Mogollon Historic District, is a former mining town located in the Mogollon Mountains in Catron County, New Mexico, United States. Located east of Glenwood and Alma, it was founded in the 1880s at the bottom of Silver Creek Canyon to support the gold and silver mines in the surrounding mountains. The "Little Fannie" mine became the most important employer for the town. During the 1890s, Mogollon had a transient population of between 3,000 and 6,000 miners. Because of its isolation, it had a reputation as one of the wildest mining towns in the West. Today Mogollon is listed as Fannie Hill Mill and Company Town Historic District on the National Register of Historic Places.

History

In the 1870s, Sergeant James C. Cooney of Fort Bayard found a rich strand of gold in the Gila Mountains near the future site of Mogollon.
A miner named John Eberle built the first cabin in Mogollon in 1889, after mines were developed in Silver Creek, which runs through the town. A jail and post office opened in 1890, and the first school was added in 1892. During this period of growth, Mogollon absorbed the population of nearby Cooney, and helped towns like Glenwood, Gila and Cliff grow because of their locations along the trail to the town. Between 1872 and 1873 the stagecoach from Mogollon to Silver City was robbed 23 times by the same assailant. He was eventually apprehended by agents of the Wells Fargo.

Little Fanny was an extremely dusty mine. Miner's consumption, a series of ailments affecting miners, caused miners to work at Little Fanny for three years or less. In response the owners developed a method of spraying water from the jackhammers as they broke the quartz for removal, thus reducing airborne dust. In 1909, the population of Mogollon was about 2,000. That same year the town had five saloons, two restaurants, four merchandise stores, two hotels and several brothels located in two red light districts. The town also had a photographer, the Midway Theatre, an ice maker, and a bakery. The Silver City and Mogollon Stage Line provided daily service, hauling passengers, freight, gold, and silver bullion 80 miles between the two towns in almost 15 hours.

By 1915, payroll in Mogollon was $75,000 monthly. The community expanded to a population of 1,500 that year, with electricity, water, and telephone facilities. The school offered education to about 300 students.

From early in its life, Mogollon was plagued by a series of fires and floods. The first big fire of 1894 wiped out most of the town buildings, which were made of wood. Fires followed in 1904, 1910, 1915, and 1942. Citizens usually immediately rebuilt, each time using more stone and adobe. Floods rushed through Silver Creek in 1894, 1896, 1899, and 1914. They washed away mine tailings, dumps, bridges, houses, and people.

During WWI, the demand for gold and silver dropped, and many of Mogollon's mines shut down. The population in 1930 had dropped to a reported 200. The town grew again during a short resurgence in gold value during the late 1930s, but during World War II it shrank again, never recovering its stature.

In 1973, a Spaghetti Western called My Name is Nobody, starring Henry Fonda and Terence Hill, was filmed in Mogollon. A saloon and general store in town were built as part of the movie set.

Today the town has several private homes. The town is the location of several small businesses, including the Silver Creek Inn, which operates in a former boarding lodge called the Mogollon House built by Frank Lauderbaugh in 1885. The establishment is reportedly filled with ghosts from the mining era.

Mogollon historic district

The entire Mogollon community was added to the National Register of Historic Places as Fannie Hill Mill and Company Town Historic District in 1987. It was cited for its industrial and architectural legacy from 1875 through 1949.

Several mines were built in the Mogollon area, including the Little Fanny, Champion, McKinley, Pacific, and Deadwood. Together with older prospectors they extracted approximately $1.5 million of gold and silver in 1913, about 40% of New Mexico's precious metals for that year. In their lifetime, over 18 million ounces of silver were taken from the mines of the Mogollon Mountains, which was one-quarter of New Mexico's total production. Close to $20 million in gold and silver were extracted, with silver accounting for about two-thirds of the total. Many regarded Silver City as merely a railhead for Mogollon's eight-team freight wagons packed with gold and silver ore.

With the decline in precious metal values after World War I, it was no longer profitable to continue operating the mines. The town grew again after a brief recovery in prices in 1937, but WWII again caused a slash in the demand for precious metals. This, accompanied by the devastating fire of 1942, almost finished the town. In 1952 the Little Fanny was the only mine in operation. Today it is silent.  When the Little Fanny mine closed, Mogollon deteriorated.

Education
It is in the Reserve Independent School District.

See also

National Register of Historic Places listings in Catron County, New Mexico

References

External links

 Uncle River's Mogollon News. A newsletter on happenings in the area between 1986 and 1994.
 Mogollon Enterprises, a company that preserves and operates several tourist and historic storefronts in Mogollon
 Photo gallery of Mogollon buildings

Ghost towns in Catron County, New Mexico
Tourist attractions in Catron County, New Mexico
Historic districts on the National Register of Historic Places in New Mexico
National Register of Historic Places in Catron County, New Mexico
Populated places on the National Register of Historic Places in New Mexico
New Mexico State Register of Cultural Properties